Jakob Augustsson (born 8 October 1980 in Häljarp, Sweden), is a former football defender who last played for Ängelholms FF. Prior to signing for the club, he represented Helsingborgs IF. He has also played for FC Lyn Oslo in Norway and Landskrona BoIS.

References

External links 
Eliteprospects profile

1980 births
Living people
Swedish footballers
Sweden under-21 international footballers
Sweden youth international footballers
Helsingborgs IF players
Landskrona BoIS players
Lyn Fotball players
Sandefjord Fotball players
Ängelholms FF players
Allsvenskan players
Eliteserien players
Swedish expatriate footballers
Expatriate footballers in Norway
Swedish expatriate sportspeople in Norway

Association football defenders
People from Landskrona Municipality
Footballers from Skåne County